Gilmer McCormick is an American actress and singer best known for her performance in the stage and film versions of Godspell in the early 1970s and for her role as Sister Margaret in the 1984 horror film Silent Night, Deadly Night.

Early life and education 
Born in Louisville, Kentucky, she graduated from Moravian Academy in Bethlehem, Pennsylvania in 1965. She attended Carnegie Mellon University in Pittsburgh.

Career 
McCormick was a part of the original off-Broadway cast of Godspell and was nominated for a Drama Desk Award for her performance. It was there that she met and married the music director and pianist for the show, Stephen Reinhardt. She was in two films, Squares (1972) and Slaughterhouse-Five (1972) before joining several of her fellow cast members in the 1973 film version of the musical Godspell. Her stage solo "Learn Your Lessons Well" was not included in the movie version, but it can be heard on the off-Broadway cast recording. Her later film appearances included the Burt Reynolds comedy Starting Over (1979) and The Burning Bed (1984) starring Farrah Fawcett.

McCormick was Associate Director of the Young Actors Space in Sherman Oaks, California with actor Patrick Day. She started teaching at the studio in 2003 and ended her association in 2010 upon her departure for her hometown, where she is the director in residence for the Eve Theater Company.

Personal life 
She remains married to Stephen Reinhardt, who is senior musical supervisor for Days of Our Lives, having been associated with the show for the last twenty-four years. They have one son. Their only daughter, Eve, succumbed to cancer in 2016.

Filmography

Film

Television

References

External links

Living people
American film actresses
American musical theatre actresses
Carnegie Mellon University College of Fine Arts alumni
Actresses from Louisville, Kentucky
Year of birth missing (living people)